Letipea is a village in Viru-Nigula Parish, Lääne-Viru County, northern Estonia. It is located on the Letipea cape (Letipea neem) on the coast of the Gulf of Finland about 6 km northeast of the town of Kunda. Letipea has a population of 17 (as of 1 January 2013).

On 8 August 1976, a tragic conflict between resting workers and drunk Soviet border guards took place in Letipea, resulting in the death of 8 people, with 18 more being injured.

Letipea Landscape Conservation Area (area 608,8 ha) was founded on 30 January 1992. It was proposed by Marek Vahula and others with 3 days, as a bird reserve instead of building plan of the port of Kunda. Letipea is since 2009 lively as possible location of the Estonian nuclear power station.

Letipea Ehalkivi

Ehalkivi (Sunset Glow Boulder) is Estonia's biggest pegmatite granite boulder, at the tip of the Letipea peninsula. It is the largest erratic boulder in the glaciation region of North Europe. It measures 7m in height, a circumference of 48.2m, a volume of 930m3, and a mass of approximately 2,500 tonnes.

Gallery

See also 
Letipea Lighthouse
Letipea Landscape Conservation Area
Letipea massacre

References

Villages in Lääne-Viru County
Kreis Wierland